Helliar may refer to:

Peter Helliar (born 1975), Australian actor, comedian and writer
Helliar Holm, an uninhabited island in the Orkney Isles
, a Ro-Ro ferry in service with Northlink Ferries

See also
Up Helly Aa, a fire ceremony in the Shetland Islands